Augusto de Campos (born 14 February 1931, São Paulo) is a Brazilian writer who (with his brother Haroldo de Campos) was a founder of the Concrete poetry movement in Brazil. He is also a translator, music critic and visual artist.

Work
In 1952 he founded the literary magazine Noigandres with his brother. Then in 1956 he and his associates declared the beginning of a movement. Since then he has had a number of collections and honors.

From the 1950s to 1970s his main works were directed towards visual poetry but from 1980 on, he intensified his experiments with new media, presenting his poems on electric billboard, videotext, neon, hologram and laser, computer graphics, and multimedia events, involving sound and music, as the plurivocal reading of CIDADECITYCITÉ with his son Cid Campos (1987–91).

Four of his holographic poems in cooperation with the holographer Moysés Baumstein were included in the exhibitions TRILUZ (1986) and IDEHOLOGIA (1987). A "videoclippoem", O PULSAR, with music by Caetano Veloso, was produced in 1984 at an Intergraph high resolution computer station. BOMB POEM and SOS, with music by Cid Campos, were animated at a Silicon Graphics computer station of the University of São Paulo (1992–93). His cooperation with Cid, begun in 1987, resulted in POESIA É RISCO (Poetry is Risk), a CD launched by PolyGram in 1995. The recording was developed into a multimedia performance under the same title, a "verbivocovisual" show of poetry/music/image, with video editing by Walter Silveira, and was presented in several cities in Brazil and abroad. An installation assembling his digital poetic animations.

Collections
Museo de Arte Latinoamericano de Buenos Aires (MALBA), Buenos Aires, Argentina
Museo Reina Sofia, Madrid, Spain
The Ruth and Marvin Sackner Archive of Concrete and Visual Poetry, University of Iowa Libraries, Iowa City, IA, USA

Awards
In 2015 Augusto de Campos received Brazil's Order of Cultural Merit. In 2017 he was honoured by the Janus Pannonius Grand Prize for Poetry (award of the Hungarian PEN Club).

Further reading
Perrone, Charles A. Seven Faces: Brazilian Poetry since Modernism. Durham, NC: Duke University Press, 1996.
"ABC of AdeC:  Reading Augusto de Campos." Review: Latin American Literature and Arts 73, Special issue:  Brazilian Writing and Arts (2006), 236–44.
"Brazil, Lyric, and the Americas." Gainesville: University Press of Florida, 2010.

References

External links
Archivio Conz

Archive of former website
Interview at UBU

Brazilian artists
Graphic poetry
1931 births
Living people
University of São Paulo alumni
20th-century Brazilian poets
Brazilian male poets
Tropicália
Signalism
20th-century Brazilian male writers